Helena Waller (born 10 September 1966) is a Swedish freestyle skier. She competed at the 1992 Winter Olympics and the 1994 Winter Olympics.

References

External links
 

1966 births
Living people
Swedish female freestyle skiers
Olympic freestyle skiers of Sweden
Freestyle skiers at the 1992 Winter Olympics
Freestyle skiers at the 1994 Winter Olympics
Sportspeople from Uppsala